Lizine is a commune in the Doubs department in the Bourgogne-Franche-Comté region in eastern France.

Geography
The village is built on a plateau between the Loue and the Lison rivers, with a superb view of both valleys.

Population

See also
 Communes of the Doubs department

References

External links

 Lizine on the intercommunal Web site of the department 

Communes of Doubs